Bernt Evens (born 9 November 1978) is a Belgian retired professional footballer who played  for Cercle Brugge and Club Brugge, as a defender.

On 22 June 2013 he began at Cercle Brugge as account manager.

Career
Born in Neerpelt, Evens has played for Genk, Maasland, Antwerp, Westerlo and Club Brugge.

References

1978 births
Living people
Belgian footballers
Association football defenders
K.R.C. Genk players
K.V.C. Westerlo players
Club Brugge KV players
Cercle Brugge K.S.V. players
Belgian Pro League players
Challenger Pro League players
People from Neerpelt
K. Patro Eisden Maasmechelen players
Royal Antwerp F.C. players
Footballers from Limburg (Belgium)